Rocío Banquells (born María del Rocío Banquells Nuñez, 22 June 1960 in Monterrey, Nuevo León, Mexico) is a Mexican pop singer and actress, best known for her work on television, the stage and cinema of Mexico and Latin America. Her mezzo voice is one of the most versatile voices from Mexico. She sings operetta, ranchera, rock, and ballads.

Early life and career 
Born in Monterrey, Mexico in 1960, Rocío is the daughter of Cuban actor and director Rafael Banquells and the actress Dina de Marco. She is half-sister of the actress Sylvia Pasquel (daughter of Rafael Banquells and Silvia Pinal). Her other siblings are Jose Manuel, Janette, Mary Paz, Ariadne and Rafael Jr.

Rocio began her career as a special guest in the 1968 Banquells's telenovela Gutierritoz. She moved to the stage in the early 1970s. In 1978 she starred in the musical Sound of Music along with the Mexican  singer Lupita D'Alessio. Other stage performances of Rocío are in the Mexican versions of Grease, Evita, and Jesus Christ Superstar.

In 1979, Rocio starred in the Mexican telenovelas's international success Los ricos tambien lloran, alongside Verónica Castro. Other memorable Banquells TV performances are Bianca Vidal (1983) and La fiera (1984). She realized memorable interpretations especially in playing evil characters. In 1985 she began her musical career with the album Rocío Banquells, that includes the 1980s superhits Este hombre no se toca, Luna Mágica and Abrazame.

Banquells continued her musical career during the late 1980s and early 1990s. In 1997 a legal conflict caused the Banquells retirement for over 10 years. In 2006, Banquells returned in the Televisa's reality show Cantando por un sueño, and in 2007 returned with a new album named Nací para tí, recorded  live in the Teatro de la Ciudad in Mexico City. In the same year, she returned to TV in the telenovela Pasión. In 2009-2010 Banquells starred in the Mexican version of the successful musical Mamma Mia! as Donna.

In 2012, Banquells returned with the show Noches de Cabaret, along with the Mexican singers Lucía Méndez and Manoella Torres. For her work in the recording industry, stage and television Banquells' handprints and star have been embedded onto the Paseo de las Luminarias in Mexico City, alongside her half-sister Sylvia Pasquel.

Personal life
Banquells was married twice. The first time to Pedro Mendez from 1979 to 1984, father of her daughter Pamela,  and the second the producer Jorge Berlanga from 1985 to 2005, father of her son Rodrigo.

Discography 

1985: Rocío Banquells
1986: Con él
1987: Entrega Total - First Mariachi album.
1988: En el alambre
1989: Llorarás, llorarás
1990: Un sueño que alguna vez soñe - Includes the Banquells music performances of Broadway musicals like Evita and Jesus Christ Superstar).
1990: Escucha el infinito
1991: A mi viejo - Dedicated to her father.
1993: A la Vírgen Morena  - Tribute to the Virgin of Guadalupe.
1993: Genio y figura
1995: La fuerza del amor
1996: Coincidir:Grandes Exitos
1998: Recuerdos de un sentimiento
2007: Nací para tí  - Live in the Teatro de la Ciudad.
2018: Siempre Regios (album Norteño)
2019:  Recuerdos De Oro (album Homenaje a Sonia Lopez)

Collaborations 
 No me puedo escapar de tí - (1987) Duet with Luis Miguel 
 La Bella y la Bestia (Beauty and the Beast) (1992) - Duet with Manuel Mijares 
 Las numero uno (2007) - Duet with many female singers
 Todo por amor - (2008) Duet with Armando Manzanero

Filmography

Dubbing

Theater

Awards and nominations

Premios ACE

Premios TVyNovelas

References

External links 
Rocío Banquells Official Website
Rocío Banquells' Biography  at esmas.com

1960 births
Living people
Mexican child actresses
Mexican telenovela actresses
Mexican television actresses
Mexican film actresses
Mexican stage actresses
Ballad musicians
Actresses from Monterrey
Singers from Monterrey
20th-century Mexican actresses
21st-century Mexican actresses
Mexican people of Catalan descent
Mexican people of Cuban descent
Mexican women pop singers
Women in Latin music